Oscar Muñoz is an American master magician, 1999 winner of the "Gold Cups" award from the International Brotherhood of Magicians organization. Past President of the International Brother of Magicians 2017. He is also a charter member and past President of "Ring 269" in Texas.

Magic Awards
 1999, IBM "Gold Cups" winner (1st place) 
 November 1997, 1st place, both parlor & stage competitions, TAOM
 1992, Closeup competition, Texas Association of Magicians
 Texas Top Magician Award
 2002 SAM Awards:
 Close-up
 Chairperson's Award for highest score 
 Jim Zee Award for Close-Up Magic

Works
"The Magic within you"

References
 Official website
 IBM Ring 269 website
 Magic Times, July 9, 2002

American magicians
Living people
People from Texas
Year of birth missing (living people)